Brentina (foaled May 29, 1991) was an Olympic-level dressage horse ridden by Debbie McDonald. She was owned by E. Parry Thomas.

Breeding
Brentina was by Brentano II, who was Hanoverian stallion of the year in 2003 and was second at his stallion testing. He has produced several impressive offspring, such as Barclay and Barclay II, Bone Dea II, and he is the dam-sire of Poetin. Brentina is a full-sister to the stallion Barclay II.

Pedigree
Pedigree for Brentina
1991 Chestnut mare

Dressage career
Brentina was sold to Peggy Thomas for 150,000 Deutsch Marks at the 1994 October Elite Auction in Verden. She was originally intended as a mount for Peggy, but as a young horse, Brentina threw Mrs. Thomas off and McDonald kept her as a ride. The mare has since had incredible success at the international level in dressage, becoming one of the most successful U.S. horses in history, mainly due to her excellent work ethic and the partnership she shares with her rider.

In 2003, Brentina underwent surgery to correct a breathing problem, caused by a paralyzed windpipe, that restricted air intake to 30% of normal capacity.

After a mild tendon strain at the 2004 CDI*** in Dortmund, Germany, McDonald and the Thomas' decided not to compete the mare in the upcoming Athens Olympics selection trials. However, due to their #1 standing in the USEF Grand Prix Rankings, and after a recommendation by Klaus Balkenhol, the U.S. Dressage Team Coach, the Committee on Selections of the United States Equestrian Federation added her to the short list for the Olympic Games.

Brentina was also named to the 2006 World Equestrian Games team. She completed the team competition, finishing with a very good score and helping the Americans to a bronze medal. However, her rider felt a few tentative steps during the extended trot, and decided not to ride in the individual competition, fearing it might be a sign of injury and another ride might lead to serious injury. After a full work-up in the States, scanning the tendon, the veterinarians found diagnosed the injury as a strain, and treated it with A Cell. Brentina is expected to fully recover and return to work.

On February 10, 2009, Brentina underwent surgery for colic. McDonald reported a few days later that she was on the mend and recovering well. She remained at the veterinary facility until February 23.

Brentina was retired from competition on April 17 at the Las Vegas 2009 World Cup.

Brentina has also been made into a Breyer horse model.

Accomplishments
2006
 Team Bronze at the World Equestrian Games (did not compete individually due to minor injury)

2005
 Farnam/ Platform • USEF Horse of the Year
 3rd FEI World Cup in Las Vegas, Nevada

2004
 Team Bronze Athens Olympics
 1st at the CDI*** Dortmund, Germany (won the Grand Prix and Grand Prix Special)
 1st at the U.S. Freestyle Championships/U.S. League Final

2003
 World Cup Final Champion (first U.S. pair to do so)
 2nd Team/3rd Individually, Nations Cup at CDIO Aachen

2002
 2002 USET Dressage Grand Prix Championship
 Team Silver/Individually 4th at the World Equestrian Games in Jerez, Spain
 1st U.S. Freestyle Championships/U.S. League Final (best placing for the US Team or any US rider in years)
 1st USET Grand Prix Championship/World Equestrian Games Selection Trials at the Festival of Champions.

2001
 USET Grand Prix Champions

1999
 Team and Individual Gold Medal winners at the Pan American Games

References

Dressage horses
Hanoverian horses
Individual warmbloods
Individual mares
Horses in the Olympics
Horses in the Pan American Games
1991 animal births